Cu-Bop is an album by drummer Art Blakey and The Jazz Messengers with conguero Sabu recorded in 1957 and originally released on the Jubilee label.

Reception

Allmusic awarded the album 3 stars.

Track listing 
 "Woody 'n' You" (Dizzy Gillespie) - 6:10   
 "Sakeena" (Art Blakey) - 11:55   
 "Shorty" (Johnny Griffin) - 4:32   
 "Dawn on the Harvest" (Charlie Shavers) - 12:45 [title is "Dawn on the Desert" on the record label]

Personnel 
Art Blakey - drums
Bill Hardman - trumpet 
Johnny Griffin - tenor saxophone 
Sam Dockery - piano
Spanky DeBrest - bass
Sabu Martinez - congas, bongos

References 

Art Blakey albums
The Jazz Messengers albums
1957 albums
Jubilee Records albums